KUDO may refer to:

 KUDO-LP, a low-power radio station (102.1 FM) licensed to serve Harrison, Arkansas, United States
 KOAN (AM), a radio station (1080 AM) licensed to serve Anchorage, Alaska, United States, which held the call sign KUDO from 2002 to 2013